The 2010 Neste Oil Rally Finland was the 60th Rally Finland and the eighth round of the 2010 World Rally Championship season. The rally took place over July 29–31, and is based in Jyväskylä, the capital of the Central Finland region. The rally was also the fifth round of the Production World Rally Championship and the sixth round of the Super 2000 World Rally Championship.

Jari-Matti Latvala took his second victory of the season, and the fourth of his WRC career after holding off the Citroën C4s of Sébastien Ogier, Sébastien Loeb and Petter Solberg, as the four drivers were separated by just over 30 seconds at the rally's conclusion.

In the junior classes, Intercontinental Rally Challenge championship leader Juho Hänninen made a guest appearance in the Super 2000 class, and wound up winning the class and taking two overall championship points for ninth position. Per-Gunnar Andersson also claimed an overall point, as he finished second in class. One of the selections for the Pirelli Star Driver and a protégé of former WRC driver Markko Märtin, Ott Tänak claimed victory in the PWRC, on his first appearance in the class this season.

Entry List

Results

Event standings

Special stages

Standings after the rally

Drivers' Championship standings

Manufacturers' Championship standings

References

External links 

 Results at eWRC.com

Finland
Rally Finland
Rally Finland